Pablo Daniel Escobar Olivetti (born 23 February 1979) is a football coach and former player who played as an attacking midfielder or second striker. He is the current manager of the Bolivia national under-20 team.

Born in Paraguay, Escobar represented Bolivia at international level.

Club career
Escobar started his career in the youth divisions of Olimpia, and eventually made his way to the first team although he spent more time playing for the reserves. In 2000, he was signed by the Argentine side Gimnasia y Esgrima de Jujuy, and after three years with the club, he relocated to Bolivia to play for San José in 2004. His good conditions rewarded him with a transfer to The Strongest the following season. He also had a brief stint in Cerro Porteño in 2006 before returning to The Strongest for a second spell.

On 28 August 2008, he joined Brazilian club Ipatinga. Escobar joined Santo André of Brazil on 5 January 2009. He joined Mirassol in January 2010. After about a year, he signed a 3-year contract with Paulista (Brazilian) side Botafogo-SP.

International career
In August 2008, Escobar received Bolivian citizenship in order to play for the Bolivia national football team. Between 2008 and 2017 Escobar made 25 appearances for Bolivia, netting 6 goals.
19 of his appearances were in FIFA World Cup qualification matches.

International goals
Scores and results list Bolivia's goal tally first.

References

External links

1978 births
Living people
Sportspeople from Asunción
Bolivian footballers
Bolivia international footballers
Paraguayan footballers
Paraguayan people of Italian descent
Bolivian people of Paraguayan descent
Bolivian people of Italian descent
Paraguayan emigrants to Bolivia
Naturalized citizens of Bolivia
Association football midfielders
Club Olimpia footballers
Gimnasia y Esgrima de Jujuy footballers
Club San José players
Cerro Porteño players
The Strongest players
Campeonato Brasileiro Série A players
Ipatinga Futebol Clube players
Esporte Clube Santo André players
Mirassol Futebol Clube players
Associação Atlética Ponte Preta players
Botafogo Futebol Clube (SP) players
Expatriate footballers in Brazil
Expatriate footballers in Bolivia
Expatriate footballers in Argentina
2015 Copa América players
The Strongest managers
Bolivian football managers
Bolivia national football team managers
Club Sol de América managers